Baie-de-Henne is a commune in the Môle-Saint-Nicolas Arrondissement, in the Nord-Ouest department of Haiti. It has 17,277 inhabitants.

References

Populated places in Nord-Ouest (department)
Communes of Haiti